Mitzi Shore (born Lillian Saidel; July 25, 1930 – April 11, 2018) was an American comedy club owner. Her husband, Sammy Shore, co-founded The Comedy Store in 1972 and she became its owner two years later. Through the club, she had a huge influence on the careers of up-and-coming comedians for many decades.

Early life
Shore was born Lillian Saidel in Marinette, Wisconsin, on July 25, 1930, the daughter of Jewish parents Fanny and Morris Saidel. Her father was a traveling salesman. She grew up near Green Bay, Wisconsin, and attended Green Bay East High School. She later studied art at the University of Wisconsin–Madison, but dropped out to marry Sammy Shore after meeting him in 1950.

Career

Overview
Shore's husband Sammy co-founded The Comedy Store in 1972 alongside screenwriter and actor Rudy De Luca. When Sammy and Mitzi divorced in 1974, Mitzi acquired complete ownership as part of their divorce settlement. Sammy was later quoted in 2003 by the Los Angeles Times as explaining that he "relinquished control of the club to lower his alimony payments". Shortly after she took full control, Shore obtained a significant cash loan from comedian Shecky Greene to help ensure continued operations. She was not only involved in day-to-day management but also in the recruitment and development of talent.

Comedians whose rise to fame was associated with working at the Comedy Store include Carlos Mencia, Roseanne Barr, Bill Burr, Jim Carrey, Chevy Chase, Andrew Dice Clay, Joey Diaz, Whoopi Goldberg, Bobcat Goldthwait, Tony Hinchcliffe, Sam Kinison, Bobby Lee, Jay Leno, David Letterman, Sebastian Maniscalco, Marc Maron, Joe Rogan, Garry Shandling, Duncan Trussell, Robin Williams, and John Witherspoon.

1979 strike and picket 

Shore refused to pay comics who performed in her club, insisting that the venue was a sort of "college of comedy" where comedians learned their craft rather than a money-making enterprise. However, in 1979, after the club had been expanded extensively, comedians began to insist that they be paid for their work. Shore refused and the performers picketed the establishment in what became a bitter six-week strike action. Among those involved in leading the strike were Jay Leno, Tom Dreesen, and the club's MC David Letterman.

After several months of picketing, and an incident in which Leno was injured by a car attempting to rush the picket line, Shore relented after Budd Friedman from The Improv decided to start paying comics. She then agreed to pay talent $15 (an amount equal to $ today) per set. The events in L.A. set a precedent that resulted in New York City comedy clubs beginning to pay their talent as well, and other comedy clubs across the U.S. followed suit by paying comics to perform.

Belly Room 
As early as 1978, Shore had converted the upstairs section of The Comedy Store into the Belly Room: a 50-seat audience for which she exclusively booked female comedians. At the time, professional comedy was very much a "boys' club", and bookings for female comedians were rare; opportunities for women to perform their own stand-up material with the most popular comics in the U.S. were unheard of.

Shore's liberal risk-taking with booking talent continued for decades. In the 1990s, once female comics had become more established, Shore continued to cross boundaries with her audience by creating specialty nights for Latino, gay and lesbian performers. She was also instrumental in providing a space for Black American comics in Los Angeles. Phat Tuesday's became a staple in the Black comedy scene and was the start of many of today's favorite comics.

Comedy Channel Inc. 
Shore owned and operated Comedy Channel Inc. from 1982 until her death—a company established to create and sell video tapes of performances at The Comedy Store.

In 1989, HBO launched its premium cable service The Comedy Channel. Shore's suit claimed HBO's service was an "indirect unauthorized use" of the name and trademark Comedy Channel. Mitzi Shore retained counsel James Blancarte and sued HBO for copyright infringement. The channel merged with Viacom's competing Ha! channel two years later, first under the name CTV: The Comedy Network, and then under its current name Comedy Central.

Depictions in media
The character Goldie on the Showtime series I'm Dying Up Here is based loosely on Shore.

Joe Rogan dedicated his 2018 comedy special Strange Times to Shore following her death earlier in the year.

Personal life
Shore and her husband Sammy were married in 1950 and divorced in 1974. They had four children: sons Peter, Scott, and Pauly, and daughter Sandi.

Death
On April 11, 2018, at the age of 87, Shore died of an undisclosed neurological disorder at a hospice in West Hollywood, California. She had been suffering from Parkinson's disease in her later years.

References

External links

Mitzi Shore at the Comedy Store

Mitzi Shore at Find a Grave

1930 births
2018 deaths
20th-century American businesswomen
20th-century American businesspeople
21st-century American businesswomen
21st-century American businesspeople
American comedy
20th-century American Jews
Burials at Mount Sinai Memorial Park Cemetery
Businesspeople from Wisconsin
Deaths from Parkinson's disease
Green Bay East High School alumni
People from Green Bay, Wisconsin
Neurological disease deaths in California
University of Wisconsin–Madison alumni
21st-century American Jews